Alfara de Carles is a municipality in the comarca of Baix Ebre, in the province of Tarragona, in Catalonia, Spain.

See also
La Moleta (Alfara de Carles)

References

External links 

 Local Town-Hall page
 Government data pages 

Municipalities in Baix Ebre